Clayton Harry Lyons (January 8, 1900 – September 4, 1962), commonly known as Harry Lyons, was a politician in the Canadian province of Ontario, who served in the Legislative Assembly of Ontario from 1951 to 1962. He represented the electoral district of Sault Ste. Marie as a member of the Progressive Conservatives.

He was the oldest child of James Lyons, who was an MPP for the same district from 1923 to 1934 and served for a time as the Minister of Lands and Forests.

At age 16, during the First World War, he enlisted as a private in the 227th battalion of the Canadian Expeditionary Force and served in Europe.

Prior to his election to the Legislative Assembly, Lyons ran the family's business, Lyons Fuel and Supply Company Limited, in Sault Ste. Marie. He died in office in 1962, and was succeeded by Arthur Wishart in the 1963 election.

References

External links
 

1900 births
1962 deaths
Progressive Conservative Party of Ontario MPPs
People from the Regional Municipality of York